The following is a list of the 17 cantons of the Haute-Marne department, in France, following the French canton reorganisation which came into effect in March 2015:

 Bologne
 Bourbonne-les-Bains
 Chalindrey
 Châteauvillain
 Chaumont-1
 Chaumont-2
 Chaumont-3
 Eurville-Bienville
 Joinville
 Langres
 Nogent
 Poissons
 Saint-Dizier-1
 Saint-Dizier-2
 Saint-Dizier-3
 Villegusien-le-Lac
 Wassy

References